Union Township is one of the twenty-two townships of Tuscarawas County, Ohio, United States.  The 2000 census found 1,599 people in the township, 1,277 of whom lived in the unincorporated portions of the township.

Geography
Located in the eastern part of the county, it borders the following townships:
Warren Township - north
Orange Township, Carroll County - northeast
Monroe Township, Harrison County - southeast
Mill Township - south
Goshen Township - west

Two villages are located in Union Township: part of Dennison in the southwest, and part of Roswell in the northwest.

Name and history
It is one of twenty-seven Union Townships statewide.

Government
The township is governed by a three-member board of trustees, who are elected in November of odd-numbered years to a four-year term beginning on the following January 1. Two are elected in the year after the presidential election and one is elected in the year before it. There is also an elected township fiscal officer, who serves a four-year term beginning on April 1 of the year after the election, which is held in November of the year before the presidential election. Vacancies in the fiscal officership or on the board of trustees are filled by the remaining trustees.  The current trustees are Ronald Carman, Matt Liggett, and Joe Martinelli, and the fiscal officer is Deborah Lukens.

References

External links
County website

Townships in Tuscarawas County, Ohio
Townships in Ohio